San Martino di Lupari is a comune (municipality) in the Province of Padua in the Italian region Veneto, located about  northwest of Venice and about  north of Padua.

San Martino di Lupari borders the following municipalities: Castelfranco Veneto, Castello di Godego, Galliera Veneta, Loreggia, Loria, Rossano Veneto, Santa Giustina in Colle, Tombolo, Villa del Conte.

The town is home to a futsal team, the Luparense.

References

Cities and towns in Veneto